State Route 3 (SR 3) is a  state highway located in southern Maine. It is a major interregional highway, connecting the Interstate 95 corridor to the Atlantic coast. The western terminus is at SR 8, SR 11 and SR 27 in Augusta and the eastern terminus is at SR 102 and SR 198 in Mount Desert. Major cities and towns along the length of SR 3 include Augusta, Belfast, Ellsworth, and Bar Harbor.

Route description 

SR 3 begins at Civic Center Drive (SR 8/SR 11/SR 27) in the northwest corner of Augusta.  SR 3 heads east using the Augusta Bypass, a controlled-access road completed in 2004 to alleviate congestion in the city center caused by traffic headed to and from I-95. The bypass ends at North Belfast Avenue (US 202/SR 9) on the east end of Augusta.  SR 3 runs concurrently with US 202 and SR 9 (the Belfast Road) to the village of South China, where US 202 and SR 9 split to the north. SR 3 continues east to the city of Belfast, where it interchanges with US 1 west of downtown.

SR 15 joins US 1 and SR 3 in downtown Bucksport and splits to the south in Orland after . US 1 and SR 3 continue along the Acadia Highway to the city of Ellsworth.

SR 3 leaves US 1 at The Triangle, an intersection at the south end of Ellsworth that has been the center of numerous traffic problems within that city . Entering the Trenton township, the remainder of the route is designated as the Acadia All-American Road.   Continuing south through Trenton, the route crosses a causeway to Mount Desert Island and intersects with SR 102 and SR 198, which run along the island's western side. 

SR 3 turns east follows the eastern shore to the tourist town of Bar Harbor, then continues south through Acadia National Park to the village of Northeast Harbor. SR 3 intersects with SR 198 and turns north towards the village of Somesville.  SR 3 and SR 198 intersect with SR 102 in Somesville; SR 3 ends and SR 198 turns north onto SR 102, eventually meeting SR 3 again near the Mount Desert Island causeway.

On the southern end of Mount Desert Island, and along the concurrency with SR 198, SR 3 signs lack directional indicators.  This was intentionally done to avoid confusion, as a motorist on the southern part of the island driving on SR 3 westbound is actually traveling east (and vice versa).  SR 3 signs along this stretch have "Route" in place of directional banners.  Directional signs begin appearing westbound and stop appearing eastbound just east of Seal Harbor when the highway begins to loop around the island.

History 
When originally designated in 1933, the western terminus of SR 3 was located in downtown Portland. It was cosigned on sections of SR 26, SR 4 and SR 11 between Portland and Augusta. In 1946-7, the western portion of the route was truncated to Augusta and its western terminus was moved to the intersection of Bangor Street and North Belfast Avenue, where it began cosigned with US 202 and SR 9.

In 2004, the Augusta Bypass was completed, providing a connection between I-95 and points east which bypasses downtown Augusta. SR 3 was rerouted onto the new bypass, proceeding northwest to a new interchange at exit 113.  The bypass connected to North Belfast Avenue where SR 3 joined US 202/SR 9 and continued its existing route eastward.

In 2013, the bypass was extended west of I-95 to connect with Old Belgrade Road and serve the new Alfond Center for Health and Cancer Center.  The Exit 113 interchange was reconfigured to provide full access and SR 3 was extended along the northern segment of Old Belgrade Road to its present western terminus at Civic Center Drive (SR 8/SR 11/SR 27).

Junction list

See also 

 List of state highways in Maine

References

External links

003
Transportation in Kennebec County, Maine
Transportation in Waldo County, Maine
Transportation in Hancock County, Maine